The 2001 World Judo Championships were the 22nd edition of the World Judo Championships, and were held at Olympiahalle in Munich, Germany in 2001.

Medal overview

Men

Women

Medal table

Results overview

Men

60 kg

66 kg

73 kg

81 kg

90 kg

100 kg

+100 kg

Open class

Women

48 kg

52 kg

57 kg

63 kg

70 kg

78 kg

+78 kg

Open class

External links
 
 Competition Results - 2001 World Judo Championships (International Judo Federation)

W
J
World Judo Championships
International sports competitions hosted by Germany
Sports competitions in Munich
2000s in Bavaria